Rick Nicita (born Charles Richard Nicita, 15 December 1945) is an American entertainment executive, talent agent, and motion picture/TV producer. Nicita is a former co-chairman and managing partner of Creative Artists Agency.

Career

William Morris Agency
Before turning exclusively to production and consultation in 2017, Rick Nicita spent five decades as a professional talent agent and manager starting May 1968 with the William Morris Agency (WMA), New York City, and later transferring to WMA's Beverly Hills offices in 1976. At WMA, Nicita started in the mailroom and earned his full agenting position over time, a traditional rite of initiation.

In a 2003 interview, Rick Nicita detailed his early days with William Morris: "I had dropped out of Fordham Law School when I realized that very little of the study and practice of law interested me. I spent many weeks trying to figure out what I wanted to do--- not what I should do, or what was easiest, or what society wanted me to do, but what I wanted to do. I always loved movies so I decided that I would be in the movie business. I called a fraternity brother who was temporarily working at William Morris and asked him to help me get a job there. I didn't even know what an agent did. I loved it the minute I started."

Creative Artists Agency (CAA)
Rick Nicita left the William Morris Agency in 1980 to join then four year-old Creative Artists Agency, this after being hand-selected by CAA's leadership of the time, which included founders Michael Ovitz and Ronald Meyer. Nicita was later named co-chairman of CAA and then managing partner, all of this within the historical era in which CAA was considered the world's dominant talent agency.

During his time with CAA, Rick Nicita maintained a client list that included Francis Ford Coppola, Al Pacino, Rob Reiner, Bette Midler, Mick Jagger, David Lynch, Christopher Walken, Debra Winger, Tom Cruise, Anthony Hopkins, Nicole Kidman, Kurt Russell, Sally Field, and others.

Morgan Creek and RPMedia
Rick Nicita left Creative Artists Agency in 2008 to become Morgan Creek's Co-chairman and COO. Nicita departed Morgan Creek in 2011, later returning to talent representation via his self-created RPMedia shingle. (RP is an acronym for "Rick and Paula").

Personal life
Rick Nicita is the son of Frances (née Scapolito) and ed Nicita. Nicita was born in Mount Vernon, New York. He and his family moved to Larchmont, New York in 1952, where he graduated from Mamaroneck High School, class of 1963. Nicita later attended Wesleyan University, graduating class of 1967.

In 1969, Rick Nicita married casting director/producer Wallis Nicita (née Lindburg). They divorced in 1983. They had a son, Jesse, born 1979.

In 1984, Rick Nicita and Paula Wagner were married. Wagner was a fellow CAA talent agent who later moved to producing via Cruise/Wagner Productions, a company she formed with her then client, Tom Cruise. For many years, Rick Nicita and Paula Wagner were cited in the international media as "Hollywood's Power Couple". Nicita and Wagner remain married as of 2021. They have a son, Zachary, born 1987.

References

External links

1945 births
American film producers
American talent agents
Living people
American mass media company founders